Sir Francis Joseph Campbell (October 9, 1832 – June 30, 1914) was a British-American anti-slavery campaigner, teacher and also the co-founder of the Royal National College for the Blind in the United Kingdom.

He was born near Winchester, Tennessee, USA, and lost his sight at the age of five following an accident. A talented musician, he taught music and at the age of 16 was appointed music master at the Tennessee School for the Blind and later went on to become musical director at the Wisconsin School for the Blind. He also taught at the Perkins Institute for the Blind in Watertown, Massachusetts.

It was while he was teaching at Wisconsin that his anti-slavery views became publicly known and at one point he was given twenty four hours to renounce them or face being hanged. He refused but was spared death because of public sympathy for his blindness.

He would later become a frequent traveller between the United States and the United Kingdom and Europe, and in 1871 helped Thomas Armitage to establish The Royal Normal College and Academy for the Blind near Crystal Palace in London. It was during a visit to London after studying in Berlin that he called on Dr. Armitage with a letter of introduction and was invited to dinner. Over dinner, Campbell told his host about his plans to establish a training college for the blind in the United States, but Armitage urged him to make London its home. The college was founded with two students, and Campbell was its first principal. The college continues to the present day, and is now known as the Royal National College for the Blind.

Campbell was also the first blind person to climb Mont Blanc. In his later years he became a naturalised Briton and in 1909 was knighted as a Knight Bachelor by King Edward VII. He retired as principal of RNC in 1912 and was succeeded by his son, Guy Marshall Campbell.

Legacy

The Francis Joseph Campbell Award is an annual award given by the American Library Association for any person who has made an outstanding contribution to the advancement of library services for the blind. It consists of a citation and a medal.

References

External links

1832 births
1914 deaths
American civil rights activists
Knights Bachelor
Naturalised citizens of the United Kingdom
American blind people
American emigrants to England
People associated with the Royal National College for the Blind
Founders of English schools and colleges
People from Franklin County, Tennessee
19th-century British philanthropists